Atla tibelliorum is a rare species of saxicolous (rock-dwelling) in the family Verrucariaceae. Found in Finland and the United States, it was formally described as a new species in 2016 by Juha Pykälä and Leena Myllys. It has also been collected from Franklin Bluffs, Alaska, where it was growing on high-pH soil in dwarf shrub tundra. The species epithet tibelliorum honours "Sanja and Leif Tibell, the mother and father of the genus Atla".

References

Verrucariales
Lichen species
Lichens described in 2016
Lichens of Northern Europe
Lichens of Subarctic America